SDF3, SDF-3, Sdf3, Sdf-3 may represent:

 Spatial data file 3 (SDF3)
 Stromal cell-derived factor-1 (SDF-1, SDF1, Sdf1)
 Stromal cell-derived factor-1 alpha (SDF-1a, SDF1a, Sdf1α)
 Stromal cell-derived factor-2 (SDF-2, SDF2, Sdf2)
 Stromal cell-derived factor-3 (SDF-3, SDF3, Sdf3)
 Stromal cell-derived factor-4 (SDF-4, SDF4, Sdf4)
 SDF-3 Pioneer Super Dimensional Fortress, a massive spaceship from the animated series Robotech
 Dataflow SDF: For Free (SDF3)